Lukulu East is a constituency of the National Assembly of Zambia. It covers Lukulu District in Western Province, including the town of Lukulu.

List of MPs

References 

Constituencies of the National Assembly of Zambia
Constituencies established in 1991
1991 establishments in Zambia